Holy Trinity Parish Church is the parish church of Sutton Coldfield, Birmingham, England. It is Grade I listed and gives its name to the ward in which it stands, Sutton Trinity.

History
The first church on the site is thought to have been built in the 13th century, associated with the nearby Sutton Coldfield manor. The earliest part of the current building, the west tower, dates from the late 15th century. In the 1530s, Bishop John Vesey extended the church with two side aisles and added an organ. In the 18th century, galleries, pews and bells were added to the church.

Inside the church are the tomb of Bishop Vesey, as well as a font, acquired in the 19th century from the Church of St Lawrence, Over Winacre, Nottinghamshire. The ornate, early 17th-century screens and panelling, fitted in 1875, were removed from the choir and organ casing of Worcester Cathedral in 1864.

In 1835 the church built a chapel near Mere Green which later became St James' Church, Hill. In 1853 part of the parish was taken to form a new parish for St James' Church.

Today
Formerly in the mediaeval Diocese of Lichfield, the church now operates within the Diocese of Birmingham.

The "Friends of Holy Trinity Parish Church" was established in September 2013 to raise funds for the church. The inaugural Patron was Andrew Mitchell MP. Their first scheduled event in November 2013 was the Royal Town Gala Concert, hosted by Don Maclean.

References

Further reading

External links 

 

Grade I listed churches in the West Midlands (county)
Church of England church buildings in Birmingham, West Midlands
15th-century church buildings in England
Sutton Coldfield